VIA Corporativo is a prominent office skyscraper in the Rio Zone of Tijuana, Baja California. The building is among the tallest in the city, being the 9th tallest in the city. One of the most modern buildings in Tijuana, it was developed by Ramón Guillot Lapiedra / Estudio ARG and cost $12 million to construct.

See also
List of tallest buildings in Tijuana

External links
VIA Corporativo

Skyscrapers in Tijuana
Skyscraper office buildings in Mexico